Georgy may refer to:
Georgy (given name)
Diminituve for Georgina
Georgy, the protagonist in Georgy Girl novel, film, and song
Georgy (musical), a musical from the novel Georgy Girl

See also
Georgi (disambiguation)
Georgiy, a given name
Georgii  (disambiguation)